Alberto Bollini (born 16 June 1966) is an Italian football manager, who is in charge of the Italy national under-20 football team.

Career
On 3 February 2015 he replaced Dino Pagliari as manager of Lecce.

From to 2016 to 2017 he was in charge of Serie B side Salernitana.

In January 2019 he became manager of Serie D side Modena.

References

External links
Alberto Bollini at Footballdatabase

1966 births
Living people
Italian football managers
U.S. Lecce managers
U.S. Salernitana 1919 managers
Modena F.C. managers